Hiltermann may refer to:

Bob Hiltermann, German-born deaf actor and drummer
G.B.J. Hiltermann, Dutch journalist, political commentator, publisher and historian
Joost Hiltermann, American activist, journalist and writer.

See also
Hilterman

Surnames of German origin